Wynflaed (died ) was an Anglo-Saxon noblewoman, a major landowner in the areas of Hampshire, Somerset, Dorset and Wiltshire. There is some debate as to whether or not she should be assumed to be the same Wynflaed who was the mother of Aelfgifu of Shaftesbury and likely the grandmother of Kings Eadwig and Edgar the Peaceful, but Wynflaed is a common name and though wealthy, she was not as wealthy as royalty.

Her will lists holdings and estates including Faccombe Netherton (modern Netherton, Hampshire) and Charlton Horethorne along with estates and moveable goods such as tents, chests, cups, and clothing. Wynflaed is acknowledged as a widow vowess probably connected to Shaftesbury Abbey, with connections also to Wilton Abbey, another royal abbey.

References

External links
British Library blog
Wealthy Wynflæd’s wonderful will

10th-century deaths
10th-century English landowners
10th-century English women
10th-century English people
Year of birth unknown